Manaka Matsumoto (born 10 February 1999) is a Japanese professional footballer who plays as a forward for WE League club Nojima Stella Kanagawa Sagamihara.

Club career 
Matsumoto made her WE League debut on 12 September 2021.

References 

WE League players
People from Yokohama
Living people
1999 births
Japanese women's footballers
Women's association football forwards
Association football people from Kanagawa Prefecture
Nojima Stella Kanagawa Sagamihara players